Stand-up comedy is a comedic performance to a live audience in which the performer addresses the audience directly from the stage. The performer is known as a comedian, a comic or a stand-up.

Stand-up comedy consists of one-liners, stories, observations or a shtick that may incorporate props, music, magic tricks or ventriloquism. It can be performed almost anywhere, including comedy clubs, comedy festivals, bars, nightclubs, colleges or theatres.

History 

Stand-up as a Western art form has its roots in the stump speech of American minstrel shows, which featured an actor in blackface delivering nonsensical monologue to the audience. While the intention of stump speeches was to mock African-Americans, they also occasionally contained political and social satire. The minstrel show would later influence theatrical traditions of the late 19th and early 20th centuries, such as vaudeville and burlesque.

Charles Farrar Browne (April 26, 1834 – March 6, 1867) was an American humor writer, better known under his nom de plume, Artemus Ward, which as a character, an illiterate rube with "Yankee common sense", Browne also played in public performances. He is considered to be America's first stand-up comedian.

The first documented use of "stand-up" as a term was in The Stage in 1911, detailing a woman named Nellie Perrier delivering 'stand-up comic ditties in a chic and charming manner', though this was used to describe a performance of comedy songs rather than stand-up comedy in its true modern form.

In The Yorkshire Evening Post on November 10, 1917, the "Stage Gossip" column described the career of a comedian named Finlay Dunn. The article stated that Dunn was "what he calls 'a stand-up comedian'" during the latter part of the 19th century, although the term may have been used retrospectively.

Genres 

Stand-up has multiple genres and styles with their own formats. Common ones include:
 Alternative: Intended to counter the established figures of mainstream comedy.
 Character: A fictional persona created by the performer.
 DIY: A "new alternative" to alternative comedy.
 Musical: Humorous songs or musical parody sometimes without lyrics.
 Observational: Conversation on the absurdities of everyday life.
 Satire: Ridicule of celebrity, political figures, the establishment, religion or ideology.

Stand up performances

Opener, feature and headliner 

The host, compere or emcee "warms up" the audience and introduces the other performers. This is followed by the opener, the feature, then the headliner. The host may also double as an opener for smaller shows. Proven comics can get regular bookings for club chains and comedy venues. Jobbing stand-ups may perform sets at two or more venues on the same day.

Open mic 
Club and small venues often run open mic events; these slots may be booked in advance or left for walk-ins. Comedians use open mics to work on material or to show off their skills to get an opener slot. "Bringer shows" are open mics that require amateur performers to bring a specified number of paying guests with them in order to receive stage time.

Festivals 
As well as being a mainstay of the comedy circuit, festivals often also showcase up and coming acts, with promoters and agents using the festivals to seek out new talent.

Specials 
Experienced comics with a popular following may produce a special. Typically lasting between one and two hours, a special may be recorded on tour or at a show advertised and performed specifically for the purpose. It may be released as a comedy album, video, or on television and streaming services.

Comedy set

Routine 
A stand-up defines their craft through the development of the routine or set. These are designed through the construction and revision of jokes and "bits" (linked jokes). The routine emerges from the arrangement of bits to build an interlinked narrative or overarching theme leading to the closer (the final joke that ties the themes of the show together in a satisfying or meaningful conclusion).

Most jokes are the juxtaposition of two incongruous things and are made up of the premise, set-up, and punchline, often adding a twist, topper or tagline for an intensified or extra laugh. Delivery relies on the use of intonation, inflection, attitude and timing or other stylistic devices such as the rule of three, idioms, archetypes or wordplay. Another popular joke structure is the paraprosdokian, a surprising punchline that changes the context or meaning of the setup.

In order to falsely frame their stories as true or to free themselves of responsibility for breaking social conventions, comedians can use the jester's privilege, the right to discuss and mock anything freely without being punished. "Punching up" and "punching down" describe who should be the "butt of the joke". This carries the assumption that, relative to the comedian's own socio-political identity, comedy should "punch up" at the rich and powerful without "punching down" at those who are marginalized and less fortunate.

Joke theft 
Appropriation and plagiarism are considered "social crimes" by most stand-ups. There have been several high-profile accusations of joke theft, some ending in lawsuits for copyright infringement. Those accused will sometimes claim cryptomnesia or parallel thinking, but it is difficult to successfully sue for joke theft regardless due to the idea–expression distinction.

Audiences 

According to Anna Spagnolli, stand-up comedy audiences "are both 'co-constructors of the situation' and 'co-responsible for it'".

Audiences enter into an unspoken contract with the comedian in which they temporarily disregard normal social rules and accept the discussion of unexpected, controversial or scandalous subjects. The ability to understand the premise and appreciate the associated punchline determines whether a joke results in laughter or scathing disapproval.

Stand-up comedy differs from most other performing arts as the comedian is usually the only thing on stage and addresses the audience directly. The material should be perceived as spontaneous and only fully succeeds when the comic creates a sense of intimacy, while also discouraging heckling.

Part of the appeal of stand up is in appreciation of the skill of the performer, most people find the idea of standing on stage extremely daunting; research on the subject has consistently found that the fear of public speaking is more intense than the fear of dying.

The audience is integral to live comedy, both as a foil to the comedian and as a contributing factor to the overall experience. The use of canned laughter in television comedy reveals this, with shows often seeming "dry" or dull without it. Shows may be filmed in front of a live audience for the same reason.

Terms 

Beat: A pause specifically to create comic timing.

Bit: A section within a comedy show or routine.

Bombing: Failing to get laughs.

Callback: A reference to a joke earlier in the set.

Chewing the scenery: Being overly theatrical or "trying too hard" to get a laugh, especially when failing.

Chi-chi room: The ritzy room of a nightclub or a comedy club with niche performances.

Clapter: When the audience cheers or applauds an opinion that they agree with, but which is not funny enough for them to laugh at. Coined by Seth Meyers.

Corpsing or breaking: When the comedian laughs unintentionally during a portion of the show in which they are supposed to keep a straight face.

Crowd work: Talking directly with audience members through prewritten bits, improvisation or both.

Hack: A clichéd or unskilled comic.

Killing and dying: When a stand-up does well, they are killing. If they are doing poorly, they are dying.

Mugging: Pulling silly faces to get a cheap laugh.

Punter: A member of the audience. Primarily a British term.

The room: The space where the performance takes place. Stand-ups can "read the room" to interpret signs from the audience or "work the room" by interacting with the audience directly.

Smelling the road: Claiming that one can "smell the road" on a comedian suggests they have compromised their originality or pandered to get laughs while touring.

Tight five: A five-minute routine that is well-rehearsed and consists of a comedian's best material that reliably gets laughs. It is often used for auditions and is a stepping stone to getting a paid spot.

Warm up: To warm up a "cold" audience during the opening act before the main show. Often used at the filming of television comedies in front of studio audiences.

Work out: The process in which brand new jokes are introduced and polished over time.

Records 
Phyllis Diller holds the Guinness World Record for most laughs per minute, with 12.

Taylor Goodwin holds the Guinness World Record for most jokes told in an hour with 550.

Lee Evans sold £7 million worth of tickets for his 2011 tour in a day, the biggest first-day sale of a British comedy tour.

Peter Kay

British comedian Peter Kay currently holds multiple records for his 2010-2011 show The Tour That Doesn't Tour Tour...Now On Tour on a 112 date UK & Ireland arena tour.
Longest individual run at the Manchester Arena performing 20 nights.
First ever stand-up comedian to play 15 sold out nights at The O2, London.
The only British artist to ever play 20 consecutive nights at an arena.
Over 1.2 million tickets sold in arenas across the UK and Ireland, making it the biggest stand-up comedy tour of all time.

See also 
 Macchietta, 19th-century Italian comedy
 Rakugo, Japanese one-man comedy
 Manzai, Japanese double act comedy
 Owarai, Japanese stand-up comedy
 The Clown's Prayer, a poem or prayer that comedians use for inspiration
 Xiangsheng, Chinese stand-up comedy

References 

Stand-up comedy
Comedy genres
Comedy theatre
Humour
Live stand-up comedy shows
Show business terms
Stage terminology
Narrative techniques
Narratology